Tamara N. Jansen  (born 1967 or 1968) is a politician who represented the riding of Cloverdale—Langley City in the House of Commons of Canada from 2019 to 2021. Prior to her election as an MP, she owned and operated a large plant nursery, Darvonda Nurseries, with her husband and family in Langley, British Columbia (district municipality). She endorsed Leslyn Lewis in the 2020 Conservative Party of Canada leadership race.

Political career 
Jansen was elected to the 2019 Canadian federal election on October 21, 2019 after unseating Liberal incumbent, John Aldag, by 1302 votes.  She sat on the Finance, Health, and COVID-19 pandemic committees during the 43rd Parliament.  She logged 763 interventions on the committees; additionally, she posted 159 chamber interventions. Jansen joined the Outer Shadow Cabinet. In the 2021 federal election, she lost her seat to former MP John Aldag.

LGBTQ+ Issues 
Jansen faced criticism in April 2021 after referencing the word "unclean" while reading a bible quote in opposition to a conversion therapy ban. Jansen voted against Bill C-6, banning conversion therapy in the House of Commons on June 22, 2021. Opposing this in the house, Jansen stated she wanted to include "counsel from religious leaders on sexuality, and the rights of parents to protect and guide their children."

Electoral record

References

Living people
Conservative Party of Canada MPs
Members of the House of Commons of Canada from British Columbia
Women members of the House of Commons of Canada
21st-century Canadian politicians
21st-century Canadian women politicians
Year of birth missing (living people)